A cave is a subterranean chamber.

Cave or Caves may also refer to:

People
Cave (name)
Cave baronets, two baronetcies

Places
 Cave, Lazio, Italy
 Cave, Missouri, United States
 Cave, New Zealand
 Cave, West Virginia, United States
 Cave City (disambiguation)
 Cave Cove, a cove in South Georgia
 Cave Creek (disambiguation)
 Cave Hill (disambiguation)
 Cave Junction, Oregon
 Cave Nebula, in outer space
 Cave Spring (disambiguation)
 Caves, Aude, France

Technology
 Cave (company), a Japanese video game company
 Cave automatic virtual environment, a projection-based immersive virtual reality system
 CAVE-based authentication, used to secure some mobile phone systems
 Cave, an alternate name for the text-based computer game Colossal Cave Adventure

Entertainment
 "C*A*V*E", a season 7 episode of the television show M*A*S*H
 Cave (band), a band from Chicago
 Caves (album), an album by Elitist
 "Cave" (song), by the band Muse

Other
 Caves (beer), a dark Belgian beer
 CAVE people, citizens against virtually everything
 Cave Research Foundation, an American non-profit group dedicated to the preservation of caves, and its affiliate, Cave Books
 Commission for the Promotion of Virtue and Prevention of Vice, sometimes abbreviated CAVES

See also
 Allegory of the cave, by Plato
 The Cave (disambiguation)